The Hothem Cliffs are a line of abrupt rock cliffs at the north side of the head of Canada Glacier in the Asgard Range of Victoria Land, Antarctica. They were named by the Advisory Committee on Antarctic Names in 1997 after Larry D. Hothem, an American geodesist who wintered-over with the Australian National Antarctic Research Expeditions at Mawson Station in 1969, and with the United States Geological Survey from 1991. Just west of the cliffs is Unwin Ledge.

References

Cliffs of Victoria Land
McMurdo Dry Valleys